Wesley Francis Morgan (born October 5, 1990) is a Canadian actor and model, whose roles have included Skander Hill on Harriet the Spy: Blog Wars, the recurring role of Sam on Degrassi: The Next Generation and Prom King Josh in The Rocker. He played Brody Cooper on the show Really Me.

Morgan was born in Canada. He played Sam in Degrassi: The Next Generation's ninth season two-part episode "Beat It". He played Skander Hill in the Disney Channel Original Movie Harriet the Spy: Blog Wars, with Jennifer Stone and Melinda Shankar, and Brody Cooper in Disney channel's Really Me.

Filmography

References

External links

1991 births
Living people
Canadian male television actors
Canadian male models
Male actors from Ontario
People from Mississauga